Ascent College is a remedial school in Accra. It was founded on 22 August 2011 by Francis Kwarteng Crentsil who was a product of the University of Ghana with three students at Adabraka.It grew gradually to 88 students in a year of being run. Presently it has over 400 students per year. It currently has two main branches located at Dansoman and Adabraka in the Greater Accra Region of Ghana. The school runs mornings and evening remedial programmes in WASSCE private exams. The School also runs evening classes in English Language Proficiency and Adult Education.

References

Schools in Accra
Educational institutions established in 2011
2011 establishments in Ghana